Palus Putredinis (Latin palūs pūtrēdinis "Marsh of Decay") is a small lunar mare in the basin of Mare Imbrium. It stretches from the crater Archimedes southeast toward the rugged Montes Apenninus range located on the southeastern edge of Mare Imbrium. This region is a nearly level, lava-flooded plain bounded by the crater Autolycus and nearby highlands to the northeast and the foothills of the Montes Archimedes to the southwest. The selenographic coordinates are 27.4° N, 0.0° E, and it lies within a diameter of 180 km.

In the southern part of this area is a rille system designated Rimae Archimedes. To the south is a prominent linear rille named Rima Bradley, and to the east is the Rima Hadley, which served as the landing site for Apollo 15, and the Rimae Fresnel. Just to the northwest of the Palus Putredinis midpoint is the nearly submerged crater Spurr. Luna 2 crashed in this area on September 13, 1959..

The basalts in this mare have been interpreted as rich in radioactive elements, but low in titanium. The mare basalts sampled at the Apollo 15 landing site are, "dominated by two low‐titanium varieties, the olivine‐normative basalts (3.30 Gyr) and the quartz‐normative basalts, which are slightly older (3.35 Gyr)". Volcanic glasses show ages of 3.30–3.60 Gyr.

Gallery

See also
Volcanism on the Moon

References

External links
 Map of the region with actual names of surface features (archive).

Putredinis, Palus
Mare Imbrium